Pferdmenges is a surname. Notable people with the surname include:

 Luca Pferdmenges (born 2001), German juggler
 Robert Pferdmenges (1880–1962), German banker and politician